Isares may refer to:

Isares (EP), a 2014 EP by Manual
Macrobrochis or Isares, a genus of moth

See also
Rama Isares, Thai prince whose daughter was the namesake of Ram Buttri Road